Kunti Moktan (born 11 July 1962) is a Nepali singer. She is classically trained and sings Nepali folk and modern songs. She is best known for her folk–pop songs such as Choli Ramro, Nishthuri Mayalu and Mathi Mathi Sailungey Ma. She usually collaborate with her husband Shila Bahadur Moktan, who is a musician and a singer. Beside singing, she also teaches music at various schools.

Early life
Kunti Moktan was born on 11 July 1962 in Margaret's Hope Tea Estate, Darjeeling district, India to father Prem Kumar Sundas and mother Bishnu Maya Sundas. She completed her high school–level education from Kurseong. In her high school, she also played football. She was a part of the first women football team from Darjeeling. She moved to Kathmandu, Nepal in 1983 to pursue her musical career.

Musical career
Moktan started singing from an early age. She started her musical journey from St. Xavier's High School in Dilaram, India. When in Class 8, she passed the vocal test at All India Radio station in Kurseong and recorded her first song with All India Radio at the age of 15 and second song for Radio Nepal at the age of 18 in 1980. Both Kunti and her husband Shila Bahadur initially learnt music from Jagdish Chandra Rai in Sonada. She came to Kathmandu in 1980 for the first time to sing for the celebration of King Mahendra's birthday. She moved to Kathmandu permanently, with her husband, in 1983.

Moktan has performed in about 20 countries, including the India, United States, Japan, UK, Hong Kong, Germany, Switzerland and South Korea. Apart from singing, she plays the harmonium. Some of her most popular songs are Khutta Tandai Gara, Choli Ramro Palpali Dhakako, Sunkai Bhau Chha, Bhanchan Kohi Jindagi Yo, Mathi Mathi Sailungey Ma and Dali Dali Ma.

Personal life 

She married Shila Bahadur Moktan, a Nepali musician and lyricist, in 1983. They have two daughters Shital Moktan and Subani Moktan who are also musicians.

Discography

Albums

Singles 

 Pahadi Pyara (2018)
 Gothalo Jada (feat. Subani Moktan) (2020)
 Timro Bhaye Pugcha (2020)

Awards
Chinnalata Geet Puraskar, Nepal
Bhupalman Singh Yuba Puraskar, Nepal
Nirman Samman, Sikkim
Hits FM Music Award, Nepal
Budha Subba Music Award

References

External links
 Kunti Moktan's Songs
 Interview
 Interview, along with Shila Bahadur Moktan

1962 births
Living people
20th-century Nepalese women singers
People from Darjeeling district
21st-century Nepalese women singers
Indian emigrants to Nepal
Tamang people
Nepali-language singers from India